is a video game developed by Genki/Pack-In-Video and published by Panasonic for the 3DO.

Gameplay 

Scramble Cobra is a 32-bit game in which the player pilots an assault helicopter on 10 missions, and the game features three difficulty settings.

Development and release

Reception 

According to Famitsu, Scramble Cobra sold a total of nearly 9,000 copies in Japan. Next Generation reviewed the 3DO version of the game, rating it two stars out of five, and stated that "you have an overall experience that isn't even bad enough to be painful, just dull."

Notes

References

External links 
 
 Scramble Cobra at GameFAQs
 Scramble Cobra at MobyGames

1995 video games
3DO Interactive Multiplayer games
3DO Interactive Multiplayer-only games
Combat flight simulators
Helicopter video games
Video games developed in Japan